California State University San Marcos (CSUSM or Cal State San Marcos) is a public university in San Marcos, California. It was founded in 1989 as the 21st campus in the California State University (CSU) system.

CSUSM offers 43 bachelor's degree programs, 23 master's degree programs, an Ed.D. program, and 13 teaching credentials. The university has four colleges: the College of Business Administration; the College of Science, Technology, Engineering and Mathematics; the College of Humanities, Arts, Behavioral and Social Sciences; and the College of Education, Health and Human Services. In January 2021, the university had 979 faculty. The university is a Hispanic-serving institution.

History
Efforts by community and political leaders to bring a state university to North County date back to the 1960s. In 1969, the chancellor of the CSU system, Glenn S. Dumke, issued a report concluding that there was "an ultimate need" for a new university campus in the area.

In 1978, State Senator William A. Craven (1921–1999) of Carlsbad won $250,000 in state funding for a North County satellite campus of San Diego State University, which opened at Lincoln Junior High School in Vista with an enrollment of 148 students. In 1982, the satellite moved to larger quarters in an office building on Los Vallecitos Boulevard in San Marcos. When it appeared that the new San Marcos campus would be a satellite of San Diego State, CSU Chancellor W. Ann Reynolds insisted on an independent university with the goal of creating leadership opportunities for women and minorities. CSUSM would also go on to attract more STEM-focused students than SDSU, as well. In September 1985, Senate Bill 1060, introduced by Craven, passed, appropriating $250,000 for a feasibility study on building a university in North County. By 1988, the enrollment of SDSU North County had reached 1,250 students, and the CSU board of trustees purchased for $10.6 million the future site of CSUSM, the 304-acre Prohoroff Poultry Farm in San Marcos. The hillside site lies approximately  due east of the Pacific Ocean and  due north of downtown San Diego. The CSU trustees also requested $51.8 million in state funds for the first phase of construction.

In 1989, Governor George Deukmejian signed Senate Bill 365 (also sponsored by Craven) into law, officially creating Cal State San Marcos. Bill W. Stacy was named the university's first president in June 1989, and over the next year recruited the first 12 members of the faculty. These dozen "founding faculty" played an important role in the university's early years and are today honored at Founders Plaza on the CSUSM campus. Stacy and the faculty were given $3.9 million to begin the university.

On Feb. 23, 1990, ground was broken on the new campus, and construction began at the former chicken farm. In the fall of 1990, the first class enrolled at the new university: 448 juniors and seniors. (Initially, only upperclassmen were admitted to CSUSM.) While construction continued on the permanent campus, classes continued to be held at the former SDSU satellite location on Los Vallecitos Boulevard. An industrial facility on Stone Drive was also used to provide lab space for the biology program, and was used through January 1993. In 1991, the university conferred its first degrees, as seven students were awarded Bachelor of Arts degrees. CSUSM's first official commencement ceremony was held in May 1992.

In the fall of 1992, the permanent CSUSM campus at Twin Oaks Valley Road opened. The first buildings were Craven Hall (opened December 1992), Academic Hall, Science Hall I, and the University Commons. The university had grown to 1,700 students and 305 faculty and staff.

The university continued to grow rapidly, and by 1993 CSUSM's enrollment had grown to almost 2,500 and it received accreditation from the Western Association of Schools and Colleges. In 1995, CSUSM admitted its first freshman class and offered lower-division (and general education) courses for the first time, with enrollment growing to 3,600. The same year, the College of Education was fully accredited by the National Council for Accreditation of Teacher Education.

In 1996, CSUSM received two major gifts: $1 million from Jean and W. Keith Kellogg II, the first of a series of gifts for the Kellogg Library, and a $1.3 million bequest from Lucille Griset Spicer (presented by Spicer's siblings Richard H. Griset Sr. and Margaret Griset Liermann) to begin a student loan fund.

In early 1997, Stacy departed as university president, and Alexander Gonzalez was named interim president. In 1998, the CSU Board of Trustees made Gonzalez permanent president. By 1997, enrollment had grown to 4,400, the faculty had grown to 300 (including part-time instructors). The university also received additional major donations, including a $2.3 million gift from Leonard Evers to establish the Evers Computer Scholarship and a donation from Bob and Ruth Mangrum to build the Mangrum Track & Soccer Field. The university intercollegiate athletics department opened in 1998, and initially consisted of men's and women's golf, cross-country, and track and field.

A campus "building boom" began, with the Foundation Classroom Buildings opening in December 1996, University Hall in 1998, Science Hall II and the Arts Building in August 2002, and the University Village Apartments and the nearby M. Gordon Clarke Field House in 2003. The University Village Apartments were the university's first on-campus housing; the new student union, known as "the Clarke," was funded by $1.2 million gift pledged in 1998 by Helene Clarke in honor of her husband.

The campus' first freestanding library, the five-story, nearly  Kellogg Library later opened. The campus' Starbucks coffee is next to it.

In 2004, Karen S. Haynes was named the university's third president, following Gonzalez's departure the year previously, and the university announced that it planned to establish a nursing school. In the fall of 2004, over 7,000 students enrolled.

In 2006, the College of Business Administration's Markstein Hall opened, funded by a 2003 state grant of almost $25 million and a 2005 pledge of $5 million from Kenneth and Carole Markstein. The School of Nursing opened in the fall of 2006.

The SPRINTER light rail provides service to a station on the northeast corner of the campus. It was intentionally constructed near the University Village Apartments. It connects the campus to other cities of north San Diego County, including Oceanside, Vista and Escondido. The university's first parking garage, the six-floor, 1,605-space Parking Structure I, is near the main campus. The 106,509 gross square foot Social and Behavioral Sciences Building at the north end of the campus is next to it.

CSUSM also has an Extended Learning program. According to its website: “Extended Learning (EL) at California State University San Marcos serves as the academic outreach arm of the university. As a unit within the Academic Affairs Division, EL is North San Diego County's premier provider of continuing education and training programs. Cal State San Marcos, and—by extension, EL—is accredited by the Western Association of Schools and Colleges.”

For the 2011–2012 academic year, tuition and fees rose to $6,596, a 31% increase attributed to the state's budget crisis; it was the largest such percentage increase in the United States.

Academics
The university is accredited by the Western Association of Schools and Colleges (WASC).

The university has four colleges:
College of Business Administration (COBA): There are seven undergraduate departments—Accounting; Finance; Global Business Management; Management; Management Information Systems; Marketing; and Operations and Supply Chain Management). There are three graduate programs—Master of Business Administration (MBA); Fully Employed MBA; and Specialized MBA.
College of Science, Technology, Engineering and Mathematics (CSTEM): There are seven departments—Biological Sciences; Biotechnology; Chemistry and Biochemistry; Computer Science and Information Systems; Engineering; Mathematics; Physics)
College of Humanities, Arts, Behavioral and Social Sciences (CHABSS): There are 22 departments—American Indian Studies; Anthropology; Communication; Economics; Environmental Studies; Ethnic Studies; Film Studies; Global Studies; History; Liberal Studies; Literature and Writing Studies; Modern Language Studies; Philosophy; Political Science; Psychology; School of Arts: Art, Media and Design; School of Arts: Music; School of Arts: Theatre Arts; School of Arts: Dance Studies; Social Sciences; Sociology; Women's Gender and Sexuality Studies.
College of Education, Health and Human Services (CEHHS): which has three schools—School of Health Sciences & Human Services; School of Nursing and School of Education; within the schools are seven departments—Education; Human Development; Kinesiology; Nursing; Public Health; Social Work; and Speech–Language Pathology.

According to campusreel.org “Main Academic Excellence that is in line with California State University-San Marcos admission standards. Score at least a 960 on the SAT or 60 on the ACT. Maintain a GPA of at least a 3.26.” are the admission standards for the school.

Popular majors for undergraduates in 2018 included Registered Nursing, Nursing Administration, Nursing Research and Clinical Nursing at 17.67%, Business Administration (Management and Operations) at 14.03%, and Human Development, Family Studies, and Related Services at 7.62%. While popular majors for graduates were Education (General) at 30.86%, Business Administration (Management and Operations) at 13.92% and Social Work at 13.23%.

The five most popular majors for 2019 graduates were:
 Health Professions and Related Programs at 19%
 Social Sciences at 16%
 Business, Management, Marketing, and Related Support Services at 13%
 Family and Consumer Sciences/Human Sciences at 8%
 Psychology at 7%

During the COVID-19 pandemic, in 2020, all of CSUSM's classes moved online with the exceptions of science-based and performance-based classes.

Rankings 
The 2022-2023 USNWR Best Regional Colleges West Rankings ranks San Marcos 7 on Top Performers on Social Mobility, 10 on Best Undergraduate Teaching (tie), 17 on Top Public Schools, 33 in Best Value Schools and 293 in Nursing (tie).

Demographics

In 2019 60% of the students were female, 40% male. There are also a sizable number of transfer students from community colleges. The "local admissions area community colleges" for CSU San Marcos are Mount San Jacinto College in Riverside County and Mira Costa College and Palomar College in San Diego County. About 50 percent of transfer students are from North San Diego County, 2 percent from San Diego County elsewhere; and 48 percent from Riverside County.

The school is thought to be above average in terms of general diversity, they are ranked #1,050 nationwide.

This CSU is still considered somewhat of a “small school”—especially in comparison to other San Diego County institutions such as San Diego State University and University of California, San Diego. Looking to expand, the campus master plan envisions the university growing to an enrollment of 25,000.

In 2020, 47% of students receive Pell Grants (United States Department of Education).

Student life
There are over 100 recognized student organizations on campus.
The school's clubs and organizations include: cultural/religious clubs (French Club, German Club, Movimiento Indian Student Organization, Estudiantil Chicano de Aztlan (M.E.Ch.A), Vietnamese Student Association, Hillel, Catholic Club, etc.), service clubs (volunteering), academic clubs (often tied to a students major or minor), Special interest (Anime and Gaming, Theater, Improv, Ocean Conservation, Sustainability, Border Angels, Students for Life, Student Veterans Organization, Transitions Collective, etc.) and political clubs (College Democrats and College Republicans). The school has many Honor Societies as well.

The student newspaper is called  The Cougar Chronicle.

CSU San Marcos is a "perennial top performer" in RecycleMania, a nationwide college and university recycling competition, and had been ranked #1 for six consecutive years (2005–2011).

Greek life
CSUSM recognizes several fraternities and sororities, each belonging to one of three different governing councils. Social fraternities belong to the Interfraternity Council, while social sororities belong to the Panhellenic Council. 

Additionally, cultural-interest fraternities and sororities belong to the Multicultural Greek Council.

University Student Union
The University Student Union (USU) consists of various student groups, cultural centers, a gender center, an LGBTQ+ center, an extended food court, a convenience store [called “The Market”], two game rooms, a ballroom, an outdoor amphitheater, and a commuter lounge which includes a shower and lockers. In the food court are a Panda Express, SubConnection, Caliente, and WOW American Grill. On the east side of the USU is Crash's Cafe (formerly Jazzman's Cafe) and Bakery, which sells coffee and pastries. The USU offers many spaces for students to gather between classes with seating, electronic charging ports and restrooms. The indoor windows showcase panoramic views of the San Marcos valley.

University District (North City) and housing
North City, an urban district of San Marcos, intended to directly serve the entire North County San Diego community, is just across from the university's main campus. See Northcity.com. Several other buildings, including student and market apartment complexes with ground-level restaurants, numerous small businesses and residential complexes, a medical center, and a hotel are all in the district.

The university has threehousing options: the University Village Apartments (UVA), the Quad, and North Commones, which is opening at the start of the 2022-23 School Year. The first two are apartment-style dorms with fitness centers, pools, game rooms, common areas and more, and North Commons is freshmen oriented, and more dorm style housing. The Quad is directly east  from the universities Extended Learning Building (ELB) which is directly linked to campus with a second level pedestrian bridge.

Farmer's Market
There is a farmer's market every Tuesday afternoon in North City underneath the Quad Housing.

Athletics

The Cal State–San Marcos (CSUSM) athletic teams are called the Cougars, and their official colors are bright/royal blue and white. The university is a member of the Division II level of the National Collegiate Athletic Association (NCAA), primarily competing in the California Collegiate Athletic Association (CCAA) since the 2015–16 academic year. The Cougars previously competed as an NAIA Independent within the Association of Independent Institutions (AII) of the National Association of Intercollegiate Athletics (NAIA) from 1998 to 1999 (when the school began its athletics program and joined the NAIA) to 2014–15.

CSUSM competes in 15 intercollegiate varsity sports: Men's sports include baseball, basketball, cross country, golf, soccer and track & field (indoor and outdoor); while women's sports include basketball, cross country, golf, soccer, softball, track & field (indoor and outdoor) and volleyball. Former sports included cheerleading and dance.

Mascot
The original mascot of the campus was Tukwut, the name for the California mountain lion in the Luiseño language of the local Native American Luiseño people. However, the mascot was "dropped for something with more ring," and in a referendum students selected "cougar" over "mountain lion." The dropping of the indigenous word was criticized by a faculty member at CSU San Marcos.

Accomplishments
CSU San Marcos leads as of 2020 in the Women's Golf CCAA Championships and was the runner-up in the 2019 NCAA Division II Women's Golf Championships.

Notable people

Alumni
 Mark Hoppus, member of rock band Blink-182
 Kimberly Dark, performance artist, writer, and sociologist
 Robert C. Nowakowski, Rear Admiral in the United States Navy
 Shaun White, professional snowboarder, skateboarder, and musician
 Mason Grimes, professional soccer player
 iDubbbz, YouTuber
 Tiffany van Soest, professional Muay Thai kickboxer
 Taylor Tomlinson, comedian (non-graduate)

Presidents
 Bill W. Stacy (1989–1997), who left to become chancellor of the Chattanooga campus of the University of Tennessee
 Alexander Gonzalez (1997–2003), previously the provost of the California State University, Fresno who left CSUSM to become president of the larger California State University, Sacramento
 Roy McTarnaghan (2003–2004), interim president
 Karen S. Haynes (2004–2019), former president of University of Houston–Victoria, who joined CSUSM in February 2004. In February 2019 she announced her intention to retire at the end of that academic year. 
 Ellen Neufeldt (2019–current), formerly vice president of Old Dominion University, Neufeldt became president effective July 2019.

Explanatory notes

References

External links

 
 

San Marcos
California State University San Marcos
Universities and colleges in San Diego County, California
Education in San Marcos, California
North County (San Diego County)
Schools accredited by the Western Association of Schools and Colleges
Educational institutions established in 1989
1989 establishments in California